Narine Simonian (sometimes written only as Nariné, born 1965 in Gyumri, Armenia) is one of the most baroque French organists, as well as a pianist, musical director and producer of operas, born in Gyumri, Armenia. Nariné is also an organist, an harpsichord and pianoforte player as well as a pianist, mainly specializing in baroque genre, with a strong emphasis on Johann Sebastian Bach.

President of the French nonprofit Association "Les Amis de Gumri.France" ("Friends of Gyumri"), Nariné dreams of raising enough money to set up an organ in her native city, Gyumri (Leninakan).

Biography 
Born in the city of Gyumri, in 1965, Narine started studying the instrument at the age of six years. In 1976, she was admitted to the Normal School of Music, where she graduated and was awarded the gold medal in 1980. From 1981 to 1985, Narine Simonian followed the Curriculum of the National School of Music of Yerevan, where she graduated as a professional concert pianist (first prize, unanimously awarded) and soloist of chamber music ensemble. She also graduated as a professional concert organist and was, again, awarded the first prize unanimously, in 1989. From 1989 to 1991, she was a soloist at the Philharmonic Hall of Yerevan Armenia and gave concerts and master-classes in Moscow, Tallinn, Helsinki, etc...

In 1991, she decided to take classes in France, under the direction of famed French organist Marie-Claire Alain, Huguette Dreyfus and Andre Isoir. She was awarded the First Prize for organ unanimously at the CNR of Rueil-Malmaison, class of Marie-Claire Alain (1993) and received the First Prize unanimously at the national competition of Organ in the Paris area, in 1995 (Ile-de-France). In 1994, she received the Citation of Excellence in the competition for excellence in organ CNR of Rueil-Malmaison, class of Marie-Claire Alain, and the Award of Excellence (mention virtuosity) in organ at the CNR of Rueil Malmaison Class Susan Landale (1995). She also won the Grand Prize Contest International Mendelssohn-Liszt in Switzerland in 1994. Since 2009, she has also had the great privilege of being advised by the illustrious Andre Isoir.

Concerts 
Narine Simonian has given a tremendous number of concerts throughout France (from the church of Saint-Jean-de-Malte Aix-en-Provence to the Abbey of La Prée, from Notre-Dame of Valence, etc.), as well as in Paris (The Notre-Dame cathedral of Paris, the Madeleine church, the Saint-Eustache church, the Saint-Roch Armenian church of Paris, the Saint-Germain-des-Prés church in November 2008, Issy-les Moulineaux, etc...). She has also given concerts in Russia, Belgium, Switzerland (in Bulle, at Saint-Pierre des des Liens) where she has a recorded a CD, in Finland, at Kiev (Ukraine in 2003 with Dominique de Williencourt and in November 2008 at the Organ Hall), in North America (New York on 1 November 1998, at the Armenian Evangelical Church of New York, in Montreal and in South America in 1997, along with Olivier Latry (Argentina, Uruguay at the Festival Internacional del Uruguay Órgano.

In the most recent years, her inclination led her to concentrate – without abandoning her pianist and organist solo career – on the production and musical direction of baroque operas.

World Premiere of the Organ Opera version of Gluck Iphigénie en Tauride
On 25. and 26. November 2009, Narine Simonian created in the heart of Paris, Le Marais area, at the Eglise Sainte-Croix de Paris Christoph Willibald Gluck's opera in 4 acts "Iphigénie en Tauride" transposed for organ, for the pleasure of an informed public. Accompanied by the Polish pianist Jozef Kapustka, Narine Simonian directed and produced this opera, staged by the young choreographer Helene Haag, with the financial help of the Halmahera family holding. In the main roles: Russian soprano Irina Tiviane (Iphigenia), Canadian-Ukrainian tenor Sergei Stilmachenko (Orestes), Raphael Schwob (Pylades), French tenor Olivier Ayault (Thoas), French soprano Anne Rodier (Diane) and Iulia Vacaru (Female Greek). One of two premieres of this opera has been the subject of an audio recording and a compact-disc has been distributed. A video has also been shot by Dov B. RUEFF, the documentary director, who works with the German-French Arte TV Channel.

Recordings 
 Mendelssohn, Liszt, Guillou, grandes orgues de Saint-Eustache (Paris), Sepm Quantum, Paris, 1996 (4 diapasons)
 Jean-Sébastien Bach, orgue Mooser de Saint-Pierre aux Liens (Bulle, Suisse), Sepm Quantum, Paris, 1997 (5 diapasons).
 Divine Liturgie et chants traditionnels arméniens, Sepm Quantum, Paris, 1998 (4 diapasons).
 Jean-Sébastien Bach, petits Préludes, Fugues, Suite anglaise n°6, Préliminaires au clavier ...tempéré, Sepm Quantum, Paris, 2000.
 Iphigenie en Tauride, Gluck, organ version with Jozef Kapustka, March 2010.

References

https://books.google.com/books?id=q8YJAQAAMAAJ&q=Narin%C3%A9+Simonian&dq=Narin%C3%A9+Simonian&hl=en&sa=X&ei=pkqYVcrOOMGRsAHP3piADQ&ved=0CCQQ6AEwAg

External links 
 
 
 Nariné Simonian, assisted by Jozef Kapustka during world premiere of opera at the Allen organ Iphigénie en Tauride, played at Cathedrale Sainte-Croix-Des-Arméniens, Paris 2008
 In "France Orgue", the reference French magazine for organ by Didier Hème
 Concert notice published on October 10. 1998 in ''The Armenian Reporter'
 Concert in Ukraine with Dominique de Williencourt

People from Gyumri
Armenian pianists
Armenian women pianists
French classical organists
21st-century French women classical pianists
Women organists
1965 births
Living people
Organ improvisers
Music directors (opera)
21st-century conductors (music)
21st-century French women musicians
21st-century organists